Roman Șumchin is a Moldovan footballer who plays as forward for CS Petrocub.

International career
Șumchin was called up to the senior Moldova squad for a UEFA Euro 2016 qualifier against Russia in October 2015.

References

External links
 

1993 births
Living people
Moldovan footballers
Association football forwards
CS Petrocub Hîncești players